Susan Minot  (born December 7, 1956) is an American novelist, short story writer, poet, playwright, screenwriter and painter.

Early life
Minot was born in Boston, Massachusetts, and grew up in Manchester-by-the-Sea, Massachusetts. Her father, George Richards Minot, was born in 1927 and worked as a banker and stockbroker in Boston. Her mother, born Helen Ruth Hannon in 1929, known as Carrie Minot, was a mother and homemaker, was killed on January 16, 1978, when the car she was driving was hit at a train crossing, the signals being down after an ice storm.

Career
Minot's first book, Monkeys, won the 1987 Prix Femina étranger in France and was published in a dozen countries. Her other books, all published internationally, are Lust & Other Stories, Folly, Evening, Rapture, Poems 4 A.M., and Thirty Girls.

In 1984, she received first prize in the Pushcart Prize for her story "Hiding". Among the anthologies that include her fiction are The Best American Short Stories 1984 and 1985 and the Pen/O. Henry Prize Stories 1985, 1989 and 2011.

Minot's poems and stories have been published in The New Yorker, Grand Street, The Paris Review, GQ, Kenyon Review, River City, New England Review, Swink, Mississippi Review, H.O.W., Marie Claire (UK edition), Fiction, Northwest Humanities Review and Atlantic Monthly. Her nonfiction and travel writing have appeared in The Best American Travel Writing 2001 and McSweeney's, The New York Times, The Paris Review, Vogue, Travel and Leisure, Esquire, American Scholar, House & Garden, Condé Nast Traveller, Victoria, and Porter Magazine.

Minot has taught creative writing at New York University, Stony Brook Southampton, and Columbia University.

Minot wrote the screenplay for Stealing Beauty (1996) with Bernardo Bertolucci, and co-authored Evening (based on her novel of the same name) with Michael Cunningham.

Minot's book of poems Poems 4 AM was published in 2002.

The Little Locksmith, a play based on the book by Katharine Butler Hathaway (1942), was performed in North Haven, Maine in 2002, starring Linda Hunt.

Themes and criticism
Time, death and desire are main themes in Minot's work. Sexuality and relationships, romantic and familial, are explored. Her second book, Lust & Other Stories, focuses on "the relations between men and women in their twenties and thirties having difficulty coming together and difficulty breaking apart". Reviewing her novella Rapture in The Atlantic Monthly, James Marcus wrote, "Sex and the single girl have seldom been absent from Susan Minot's fiction", and Dave Welch at Powells.com identifies one of Minot's themes as "the emotional safeguards within family and romantic relations that hold people apart". Of Lust, Jill Franks wrote that Minot begins with short, simple sentences, building gradually to longer ones to create the inevitable conclusion: men don't love like women do. In Folly, a Bostonian woman of privileged background is involved with two different men as she tries to find equilibrium with her society and family in the era between the world wars. Evening is the story of a woman on her deathbed looking back over her life and returning to a wedding weekend 40 years earlier when she fell in love and certain paths in her life were decided. It was nominated for a Los Angeles Times Book Prize for Fiction. Thirty Girls is the story of two women: a Ugandan girl of 15 who has escaped from living two years with armed bandits of the LRA led by Joseph Kony, and an American writer, traveling with free spirits on a journalist trip to Uganda to report on the story of the abducted children.

Personal life
Minot married Davis McHenry in 1991. They divorced in 1993. She lived with her second husband, Charles Pingree, from 2000 to 2009. Their daughter Ava Minot Pingree was born in 2001. She lives with her daughter in New York City and on the island of North Haven. Minot has six siblings: Carrie Minot Bell, an artist; Dinah Minot Hubley, a photographer; Eliza Minot Price, a novelist; George Minot, a novelist; Sam Minot, a painter; and Christopher Minot, an artist. She graduated from Concord Academy in 1974 and then attended Brown University, where she studied writing and painting. In 1983 she graduated from Columbia University School of the Arts with an MFA in creative writing.

Works

Novels and stories
Monkeys. New York: Dutton, 1986. 
Lust & Other Stories. New York: Houghton Mifflin, 1989. 
Folly. Washington Square Press, 1994. 
Evening.  New York: Knopf, 1998. 
Rapture. New York: Knopf, 2002. 
Thirty Girls. New York: Knopf, 2014. 
Why I Don't Write: And Other Stories. New York: Knopf, 2020.

Screenplays
Stealing Beauty. With Bernardo Bertolucci. New York: Grove Press, 1996. 
Evening. With Michael Cunningham. 2007.

Poetry
Poems 4 A.M. New York: Knopf, 2003.

Plays
 The Little Locksmith
 On Island, an original play, premiered at Islands Theater in North Haven, Maine, August 2, 2018, directed by Lily Thorne.

References

External Links
 https://www.portlandmonthly.com/portmag/2018/07/stage-sight

1956 births
Living people
People from Manchester-by-the-Sea, Massachusetts
20th-century American novelists
21st-century American novelists
American women novelists
Columbia University School of the Arts alumni
Prix Femina Étranger winners
American women short story writers
20th-century American women writers
21st-century American women writers
Novelists from Massachusetts
American women poets
American women screenwriters
New York University faculty
Stony Brook University faculty
University of Tampa faculty
The New Yorker people
20th-century American short story writers
21st-century American short story writers
People from North Haven, Maine
Concord Academy alumni
Brown University alumni
Novelists from Florida
Novelists from New York (state)
Screenwriters from New York (state)
Screenwriters from Massachusetts
Screenwriters from Florida
Screenwriters from Maine
American women academics